() is a Japanese carbonated soft drink. It was introduced in 1884 in Kobe by the British pharmacist Alexander Cameron Sim. Like Banta, an Indian lemon drink,  is available in a Codd-neck bottle, a heavy glass bottle whose mouth is sealed by a round marble (instead of a cap) thanks to the pressure of the carbonated contents. The name  is derived from a Japanese borrowing of the English word lemonade.

History
In 1884, Sim introduced this carbonated beverage based on lemonade to the Kobe foreign settlement. This drink, sold in the distinctive Codd-neck bottle, soon became very popular with the local Japanese after it was advertised in the Tokyo Mainichi Newspaper as a preventative for cholera.

Bottle design

 is known for its distinctive Codd-neck bottle (named after its inventor, Hiram Codd). Although the Codd-neck bottle was once commonly used for carbonated drinks, today , along with Banta, is one of its very few users.

People trying  for the first time sometimes find it difficult to drink, as it takes practice to learn to stop the marble from blocking the flow. In one version of the bottle introduced in 2006, little slots were added to the cap where the marble was originally held. This prevented the flow from obstruction if the marble falls back into the cap.  is also available in plastic PET bottles and cans.

 is one of the modern symbols of summer in Japan and is widely consumed during warm festival days and nights. Empty bottles are usually collected for recycling at stalls where it is sold.

Flavours

The original  flavour is lime-lemon. As the popularity of Ramune continues to grow, there is an interesting packaging design and a variety of flavors. It includes collaborations with popular Japanese characters such as Hello Kitty and Pokemon. Some common flavors include peach, melon, and bubble gum, while some unusual flavors include takoyaki, curry, and wasabi.

See also

 Banta
 Calpis
 List of soft drinks by country
 Oronamin C Drink
 Pocari Sweat
 Sangaria (soft drink)

References

Japanese drinks
Lemon-lime sodas
Soft drinks
Scottish inventions
1884 introductions